Atakan Rıdvan Çankaya (born 25 June 1998) is a Turkish professional footballer who plays as a midfielder for Süper Lig club Ankaragücü.

Career
A youth product of Altay, Çankaya transferred to Ankaraspor in 2019 in the TFF First League. On 11 September 2020, he signed his first professional contract with Ankaragücü. Çankaya made his professional debut with Ankaragücü in a 0-0 Süper Lig tie with Sivasspor on 27 June 2020.

References

External links

1998 births
Living people
People from Konak
Turkish footballers
Turkey youth international footballers
Altay S.K. footballers
Ankaraspor footballers
MKE Ankaragücü footballers
Süper Lig players
TFF First League players
TFF Second League players
Association football midfielders